Frederick Albion Ober (February 13, 1849 - May 31, 1913) was an American naturalist and writer.

Biography
Ober was born February 13, 1849, in Beverly, Massachusetts. He received a common school education. While yet a boy, he evinced a fondness for natural history: he collected nearly all the birds of New England and noted their habits. From 1862 to 1866 he had an occupation as shoemaker. Subsequently, he attended the Massachusetts Agricultural College (now the University of Massachusetts Amherst) but due to the lack of funds he was forced to leave the college after a short time. From 1867 to 1870 he worked as employee in a drugstore and again as shoemaker.

In 1872, he abandoned his business pursuits to hunt in Florida. In 1874 he made a second trip, successfully explored Lake Okeechobee, and published in periodicals a description of the lake and its shores. From 1876 to 1878 he made ornithological surveys to the Lesser Antilles where he discovered 22 bird taxa new to science. Two of them – the Lesser Antillean flycatcher and the Montserrat oriole – were named in his honor by his colleague George Newbold Lawrence.

In 1881, moved by a desire to see the vestiges of early American civilization, he journeyed through Mexico, and during that and two subsequent trips gathered the material for several books. On his return from various explorations he prepared accounts of his travels at the request of scientific societies, and later a series of popular lectures, illustrated with photographic views, projected by the magic lantern. His lectures, originally delivered before the Lowell Institute in Boston, included "Mexico, Historical and Picturesque," "Ancient Cities of Mexico," "The Mexican Indian," "Adventures in the West Indies," and "Through Florida with Gun and Camera."

Ober was elected a member of the American Antiquarian Society in 1893.

Ober died May 31, 1913, in his home in Hackensack, New Jersey. He was among the founders of The Explorers Club in 1904.

Literary works (selected)

During his writing career, which lasted 30 years, he wrote more than 40 books, mostly travel books, but also bird books, and biographies about Amerigo Vespucci, Hernán Cortés, and Israel Putnam.

1880: Camps in the Caribbees: The Adventures of a Naturalist in the Lesser Antilles; 2nd edition, 1886
1883: The Silver City, together with Cacique John
1884: Travels in Mexico and Life among the Mexicans
1888: A Boy's Adventures in the West Indies
1895: Josephine, empress of the French
1897: Under the Cuban Flag: Or, The Cacique's Treasure
1898: Crusoe's Island; a bird-hunter's story
1900: The Storied West Indies
1901: The last of the Arawaks: a story of adventure on the Island of San Domingo
1903: The Navy Boys' Cruise with Columbus or The Adventures of Two Boys Who Sailed with the Great Admiral in His Discovery of America
1904: Our West Indian neighbors: the islands of the Caribbean Sea, "America's Mediterranean": their picturesque features, fascinating history, and attractions for the traveller, nature-lover, settler and pleasure seeker
1904: "Old Put" the patriot
1905: Hernando Cortés, Conqueror of Mexico
1906: Vasco Nuñez de Balboa
1906: Pizarro and the conquest of Peru
1906: Ferdinand De Soto and the invasion of Florida 
1907: Heroes of American History: Amerigo Vespucci
1908: A Guide to the West Indies and Bermudas: With Maps and Many Illustrations
1910: Mexico, Central America, and West Indies
1912: A Child's History Of Spain

Notes

 Young Folks History Of Mexico, 1883

References

The Literary Encyclopedia
Frederick Albion Ober Biography

External links

 
 
 
 Open Library. Frederick A. Ober 1849 - 1913

American naturalists
American ornithologists
Writers from Hackensack, New Jersey
Massachusetts Agricultural College alumni
1849 births
1913 deaths
Members of the American Antiquarian Society